This is a list of defunct airlines of Iraq.

See also
 List of airlines of Iraq

References

Iraq
Airlines
Airlines, defunct